Kevin Norwood Bacon (born July 8, 1958) is an American actor. Known for his leading man and character roles, Bacon has received numerous accolades including Golden Globe Award and a Screen Actors Guild Award and a nomination for a Primetime Emmy Award. The Guardian named him one of the best actors never to have received an Academy Award nomination. In 2003, he received a star on the Hollywood Walk of Fame.

Bacon made his feature film debut in National Lampoon's Animal House (1978) before his breakthrough role in the musical-drama film Footloose (1984). He's since starred in critically acclaimed films such as Diner (1982), JFK (1991), A Few Good Men (1992), Apollo 13 (1995), Mystic River (2003), and Frost/Nixon (2008). Other notable roles include  Friday the 13th (1980), The River Wild (1994), Sleepers (1996), Wild Things (1998), The Woodsman (2004),  Flatliners (1990), Crazy, Stupid, Love (2011), X-Men: First Class (2011), Black Mass (2015), and Patriots Day (2016). Bacon has also directed the films Losing Chase (1996) and Loverboy (2005).

He is equally prolific on television, he starred in the Fox drama series The Following from 2013 to 2015. For his role as Lt. Col. Michael Strobl in HBO original film Taking Chance (2009), he received the Golden Globe Award for Best Actor – Miniseries or Television Film and the Screen Actors Guild Award for Outstanding Actor in a Miniseries or Television Movie. Bacon starred in the title role in Amazon Prime Video series I Love Dick from 2016 to 2017 for which he was nominated for a Golden Globe Award. From 2019 to 2022 he starred in the Showtime series City on a Hill.

Bacon's prolific career in a variety of genres has led him to become associated with the concept of interconnectedness among people, having been popularized by the trivia game "Six Degrees of Kevin Bacon". In 2007, he created SixDegrees.org, a charitable foundation. He is a brand ambassador for British mobile network operator EE and has been featured in several ads for the company.

Early life and education 
Bacon, the youngest of six children, was born and raised in a close-knit family in Philadelphia. His mother, Ruth Hilda (née Holmes; 1916–1991), taught at an elementary school and was a liberal activist, while his father, Edmund Bacon (1910–2005), was an urban planner who served for many years as executive director of the Philadelphia City Planning Commission and authored the seminal text Design of Cities.

Bacon attended Julia R. Masterman High School for both middle and high school. At age 16, in 1975, Bacon won a full scholarship to and attended the Pennsylvania Governor's School for the Arts at Bucknell University, a state-funded five-week arts program at which he studied theater under Glory Van Scott. The experience solidified Bacon's passion for the arts.

Acting career

Early work 
Bacon left home at age 17 to pursue a theater career in New York City, where he appeared in a production at the Circle in the Square Theater School. "I wanted life, man, the real thing", he later recalled to Nancy Mills of Cosmopolitan. "The message I got was 'The arts are it. Business is the devil's work. Art and creative expression are next to godliness.' Combine that with an immense ego and you wind up with an actor."
Bacon's debut in the fraternity comedy National Lampoon's Animal House (1978) did not lead to the fame he had sought, and Bacon returned to waiting tables and auditioning for small roles in theater. He briefly worked on the television soap operas Search for Tomorrow (1979) and Guiding Light (1980–81) in New York.

1980s 
In 1980, he appeared in the slasher film Friday the 13th. Some of his early stage work included Getting Out, performed at New York's Phoenix Theater, and Flux, at Second Stage Theatre during their 1981–1982 season.

In 1982, he won an Obie Award for his role in Forty Deuce, and soon afterward he made his Broadway debut in Slab Boys, with then-unknowns Sean Penn and Val Kilmer. However, it was not until he portrayed Timothy Fenwick that same year in Barry Levinson's film Dinercostarring Steve Guttenberg, Daniel Stern, Mickey Rourke, Tim Daly, and Ellen Barkinthat he made an indelible impression on film critics and moviegoers alike.

Bolstered by the attention garnered by his performance in Diner, Bacon starred in Footloose (1984). Richard Corliss of TIME likened Footloose to the James Dean classic Rebel Without a Cause and the old Mickey Rooney/Judy Garland musicals, commenting that the film includes "motifs on book burning, mid-life crisis, AWOL parents, fatal car crashes, drug enforcement, and Bible Belt vigilantism." To prepare for the role, Bacon enrolled at a high school as a transfer student named "Ren McCormick" and studied teenagers before leaving in the middle of the day. Bacon earned strong reviews for Footloose.
Bacon's critical and box office success led to a period of typecasting in roles similar to the two he portrayed in Diner and Footloose, and he had difficulty shaking this on-screen image. For the next several years he chose films that cast him against either type and experienced, by his own estimation, a career slump.

After a cameo in John Hughes's 1987 comedy Planes, Trains and Automobiles, Bacon starred in John Hughes's 1988 comedy She's Having a Baby, and the following year he was in another comedy called The Big Picture.

1990s 
In 1990, Bacon had two successful roles. He played a character who saved his town from under-the-earth "graboid" monsters in the comedy/horror film Tremors, and he portrayed an earnest medical student experimenting with death in Joel Schumacher's Flatliners.

In Bacon's next project he starred opposite Elizabeth Perkins in He Said, She Said. Despite lukewarm reviews and low audience turnout, He Said, She Said was illuminating for Bacon. Required to play a character with sexist attitudes, he admitted that the role was not that large a stretch for him.

By 1991, Bacon began to give up the idea of playing leading men in big-budget films and to remake himself as a character actor. "The only way I was going to be able to work on 'A' projects with really 'A' directors was if I wasn't the guy who was starring", he confided to The New York Times writer Trip Gabriel. "You can't afford to set up a $40 million movie if you don't have your star." He performed that year as gay prostitute Willie O'Keefe in Oliver Stone's JFK and went on to play a prosecuting attorney in the military courtroom drama A Few Good Men. Later that year he returned to the theater to play in Spike Heels, directed by Michael Greif.

In 1994, Bacon earned a Golden Globe nomination for his role in The River Wild, opposite Meryl Streep. He described the film to Chase in Cosmopolitan as a "grueling shoot", in which "every one of us fell out of the boat at one point or another and had to be saved".

His next film, Murder in the First, earned him the Broadcast Film Critic's Association Award in 1995, the same year that he starred in the blockbuster hit Apollo 13. Bacon played a trademark dark role once again in Sleepers (1996). This part starkly contrasted with his appearance in the lighthearted romantic comedy, Picture Perfect (1997).

Bacon made his debut as a director with the television film Losing Chase (1996), which was nominated for three Golden Globe Awards, and won one. Bacon again resurrected his oddball mystique that year as a mentally-challenged houseguest in Digging to China and as a disc jockey corrupted by payola in Telling Lies in America. As the executive producer of Wild Things (1998), Bacon reserved a supporting role for himself and went on to star in Stir of Echoes (1999), directed by David Koepp.

2000s 

In 2000, he appeared in Paul Verhoeven's Hollow Man. Bacon, Colin Firth and Rachel Blanchard depict a ménage à trois in their film, Where the Truth Lies. Bacon and director Atom Egoyan have condemned the MPAA ratings board decision to rate the film "NC-17" rather than the preferable "R". Bacon commented: "I don't get it, when I see films (that) are extremely violent, extremely objectionable sometimes in terms of the roles that women play, slide by with an R, no problem, because the people happen to have more of their clothes on."

In 2003 he acted with Sean Penn and Tim Robbins in Clint Eastwood's movie Mystic River.

Bacon was again acclaimed for a dark starring role playing an offending pedophile on parole in The Woodsman (2004), for which he was nominated for best actor and received the Independent Spirit Award. He appeared in the HBO Films production of Taking Chance, based on an eponymous story written by Lieutenant Colonel Michael Strobl, an American Desert Storm war veteran. The film premiered on HBO on February 21, 2009. Bacon won a Golden Globe Award and a Screen Actors Guild Award for Outstanding Performance by a Male Actor in a Miniseries or Television Movie for his role.

2010s 

On July 15, 2010, it was confirmed that Bacon would appear in Matthew Vaughn's X-Men: First Class as mutant villain Sebastian Shaw. 

In March 2012, Bacon was featured in a performance of Dustin Lance Black's play, 8 – a staged reenactment of the federal trial that overturned California's Prop 8 ban on same-sex marriage – as Attorney Charles J. Cooper. The production was held at the Wilshire Ebell Theatre and broadcast on YouTube to raise money for the American Foundation for Equal Rights.

From 2013 to 2015, Bacon starred as Ryan Hardy in the FOX television series The Following. In 2013, he won a Saturn Award for Best Actor on Television for that role.

In 2015, he said in a Huffington Post interview he would like to return to the Tremors franchise. However, Bacon did not appear in Tremors 5: Bloodline (2015).

Advertising work 
Beginning in 2012, Bacon has appeared in a major advertising campaign for the EE mobile network in the United Kingdom, based on the Six Degrees concept and his various film roles. In 2015, he became a commercial spokesperson for the U.S. egg industry.

Six Degrees of Kevin Bacon 

Bacon is the subject of the trivia game titled "Six Degrees of Kevin Bacon," based on the idea that, due to his prolific screen career covering a diverse range of genres, any Hollywood actor can be linked to another in a handful of steps based on their association with Bacon. The name of the game derives from the idea of six degrees of separation.
Although he was initially dismayed by the game, the meme stuck, and Bacon eventually embraced it, forming the charitable initiative SixDegrees.org, a social networking service intended to link people and charities to each other.

The measure of proximity to Bacon has been mathematically formalized as the Bacon number and can be referenced at websites including Oracle of Bacon, which is in turn based upon Wikipedia data (and formerly from Internet Movie Database data). In 2012, Google added a feature to their search engine, whereby searching for an actor's name followed by the words "Bacon Number" will show the ways in which that actor is connected to Kevin Bacon. This feature is no longer active.

A similar measurement exists in the mathematics community, where one measures how far one is removed from co-writing a mathematical paper with the prolific and itinerant mathematician Paul Erdős. This is done by means of the Erdős number, which is 0 for Paul Erdős himself, 1 for someone who co-wrote an article with him, 2 for someone who co-wrote with someone who co-wrote with him, etc. People have combined the Bacon number and the Erdős number to form the Erdős–Bacon number, which is the sum of the two.

Music 
In 1995, Kevin formed a band called The Bacon Brothers with his brother, Michael. The duo has released seven albums. Kevin Bacon also sings in a variety of other media; he has serenaded his goats on Instagram, and sings with the band the Old 97's in his role as himself in The Guardians of the Galaxy Holiday Special.

Personal life 
Bacon has been married to actress Kyra Sedgwick since September 4, 1988; they met on the set of the PBS version of Lanford Wilson's play Lemon Sky. He has said: "The time I was hitting what I considered to be bottom was also the time I met my wife, our kids were born, good things were happening. And I was able to keep supporting myself; that always gave me strength." Bacon and Sedgwick have starred together in Pyrates, Murder in the First, The Woodsman, and Loverboy. They have two children, Travis Sedgwick (b. 1989) and Sosie Ruth (b. 1992). They reside on the Upper West Side of Manhattan. Bacon was previously in a five-year relationship with actress Tracy Pollan, in the 1980s.

Bacon has spoken out for the separation of church and state, and told The Times in 2005 that he did not "believe in God." He has also said that he is not anti-religion.

Bacon and Sedgwick appeared in will.i.am's video "It's a New Day", which was released following Barack Obama's 2008 presidential win.

The pair lost part of their savings in the Ponzi scheme of infamous swindler Bernie Madoff.

Bacon and Sedgwick learned in 2011, via their appearance on the PBS TV series Finding Your Roots with Henry Louis Gates, that they are ninth cousins, once removed. They also appeared in a video promoting the "Bill of Reproductive Rights", supporting among other things a woman's right to choose and have access to birth control.

Accolades

Awards and nominations

Other honors 

 2003, September 30: Inducted into Hollywood Walk of Fame with a star for his contribution to Motion Picture presented to him by the Chamber of Commerce.
 2004: Received the John Cassavetes Award during the Denver International Film Festival.
 2005: Received the Copper Wing Tribute Award during the Phoenix Film Festival.
 2005: Received the American Rivera Award during the Santa Barbara International Film Festival.
 2010: Honored with the Joel Siegel Award by the Broadcast Film Critics Association.
 2015: Honored with the Career Achievement in Acting Award by the Seattle International Film Festival.

See also 
 List of actors with Hollywood Walk of Fame motion picture stars

References

External links 

 
 
 
 
 Oracle of Bacon

1958 births
20th-century American male actors
21st-century American male actors
American atheists
American male film actors
American male soap opera actors
American male television actors
American male voice actors
The Bacon Brothers members
Best Miniseries or Television Movie Actor Golden Globe winners
Circle in the Square Theatre School alumni
Living people
Male actors from Philadelphia
Obie Award recipients
Outstanding Performance by a Cast in a Motion Picture Screen Actors Guild Award winners
Outstanding Performance by a Male Actor in a Miniseries or Television Movie Screen Actors Guild Award winners
Sedgwick family
People from the Upper West Side